Tubar or Tubare, is an extinct language of southern Chihuahua, Mexico that belonged to the Uto-Aztecan language family.

Morphology
Tubar is an agglutinative language, where words use suffix complexes for a variety of purposes with several morphemes strung together.

References

Sources
 

Agglutinative languages
Southern Uto-Aztecan languages
Extinct languages of North America